The Brouwer Award is awarded annually by the Division on Dynamical Astronomy of the American Astronomical Society for outstanding lifetime achievement in the field of dynamical astronomy.  The prize is named for Dirk Brouwer.

Recipients
Source: Division on Dynamical Astronomy of the American Astronomical Society

See also

 List of astronomy awards
 Prizes named after people

References

Astronomy prizes
American awards
Awards established in 1976
American Astronomical Society